The 1978 United States House of Representatives elections in Texas occurred on November 7, 1978, to elect the members of the state of Texas's delegation to the United States House of Representatives. Texas had twenty-four seats in the House apportioned according to the 1970 United States Census.

These elections occurred simultaneously with the United States Senate elections of 1978, the United States House elections in other states, and various state and local elections.

Democrats maintained their majority of U.S. House seats from Texas, but they lost two seats to the Republicans, decreasing their majority to twenty out of twenty-four seats. These elections produced a high level of turnover due to the retirements of several representatives, as well as the electoral defeat of others.

Overview

Congressional Districts

District 1 
Incumbent Democrat Sam B. Hall ran for re-election.

District 2 
Incumbent Democrat Charlie Wilson ran for re-election.

District 3 
Incumbent Republican James M. Collins ran for re-election unopposed.

District 4 
Incumbent Democrat Ray Roberts ran for re-election.

District 5 
Incumbent Democrat Jim Mattox ran for re-election.

District 6 
Incumbent Democrat Olin E. Teague opted to retire rather than run for re-election.

District 7 
Incumbent Republican Bill Archer ran for re-election.

District 8 
Incumbent Democrat Bob Eckhardt ran for re-election.

District 9 
Incumbent Democrat Jack Brooks ran for re-election.

District 10 
Incumbent Democrat J. J. Pickle ran for re-election.

District 11 
Incumbent Democrat William R. Poage opted to retire rather than run for re-election. He resigned on December 31, 1978, four days before his term would have expired.

District 12 
Incumbent Democrat Jim Wright ran for re-election.

District 13 
Incumbent Democrat Jack Hightower ran for re-election.

District 14 
Incumbent Democrat John Andrew Young ran for re-election. He lost in the Democratic Primary to Joseph Wyatt.

District 15 
Incumbent Democrat Kika de la Garza ran for re-election.

District 16 
Incumbent Democrat Richard Crawford White ran for re-election.

District 17 
Incumbent Democrat Omar Burleson opted to retire rather than run for re-election.

District 18 
Incumbent Democrat Barbara Jordan opted to retire rather than run for re-election.

District 19 
Incumbent Democrat George H. Mahon opted to retire rather than run for re-election.

District 20 
Incumbent Democrat Henry B. González ran for re-election unopposed.

District 21 
Incumbent Democrat Bob Krueger retired to run for U.S. Senator.

District 22 
Incumbent Democrat Robert Gammage ran for re-election.

District 23 
Incumbent Democrat Abraham Kazen ran for re-election.

District 24 
Incumbent Democrat Dale Milford ran for re-election. He lost in the Democratic Primary to Martin Frost.

References

1978
Texas
1978 Texas elections